Chiquilla is a ballad sung by Julio Iglesias, released in 1970 on the albums Yo Canto and Gwendolyne.

References

1970 singles
Julio Iglesias songs